Mystacoleucus atridorsalis is a species of cyprinid in the genus Mystacoleucus.

References

Cyprinidae
Cyprinid fish of Asia